Kieren Emery (born 1 June 1990) is a British rower. He was born in Münster, West Germany.

Rowing career
Emery was part of the British squad that topped the medal table at the 2011 World Rowing Championships in Bled, where he won a gold medal as part of the lightweight coxless pair with Peter Chambers.

References 

 

1990 births
Living people
British male rowers
Sportspeople from Münster
World Rowing Championships medalists for Great Britain
Durham University Boat Club rowers